Circumstantial may refer to:

Circumstantial evidence, in law
Circumstantial thinking, in psychiatry and psychopathology
Circumstantial voice, in linguistics

See also 
 Circumstance (disambiguation)